Daniel Carlsson may refer to:

Daniel Carlsson (rally driver) (born 1976), Swedish rally car driver
Daniel Carlsson (swimmer) (born 1976), Swedish swimmer

See also
Daniel Carlson (born 1995), American football placekicker
Dan Carlson (born 1970), American baseball player
Daniel Karlsson (born 1981), Swedish musician with the stage name The Moniker
Daniel Carlson, namesake of the USS Carlson